Umberto Baldini (November 9, 1921 – August 16, 2006) was an art historian and specialist in the theory of art restoration.

He earned a degree in art history with professor Mario Salmi, entered into service as inspector of the Soprintendenza of Florence, and in 1949 became director of the Gabinetto di Restauro. In this capacity he was tasked with managing the emergency of the 1966 flood of Florence that damaged many masterpieces. The result of these interventions consecrated to the world the techniques and methodology of the so-called "Florentine school" of restoration. 

In 1970 he became the first director of the Opificio delle Pietre Dure.  From 1983 to 1987 he was the director of the Istituto Centrale per il Restauro (now the Istituto Superiore per la Conservazione ed il Restauro) in Rome and, in these years, he led the restoration of the Brancacci Chapel in the church of Santa Maria del Carmine in Florence.

He then was named President of the Università Internazionale dell'Arte in Forence, and director of the Horne Museum, also in Florence.

Publications
Teoria del restauro e unità di metodologia (2 volumes). Florence, Nardini Editore, 1978-1981.
Metodo e Scienza: operatività e ricerca nel restauro. Florence, Sansoni, 1982.
Masaccio. Electa, 2001.

External links
 Obituary in New York Times
 ICCROM obituary
 Istituto Superiore per la Conservazione ed il Restauro 

1921 births
2006 deaths
Italian art historians
Conservator-restorers
People from Pitigliano